Cole Dickson Beasley (born April 26, 1989) is an American football wide receiver who is a free agent. He played college football at Southern Methodist University and was signed by the Dallas Cowboys as an undrafted free agent in 2012. He also played three seasons for the Buffalo Bills before retiring with the Tampa Bay Buccaneers in 2022. He came out of retirement a few months later in the season to re-sign with the Bills.

Early years
Beasley attended Little Elm High School, where he was an option quarterback, leading the Lobos to the Texas UIL-4A playoffs in consecutive years. Beasley was a district co-MVP, posting 1,184 rushing yards, 12 rushing touchdowns, 1,570 passing yards, and 12 touchdowns. He was rated as a two-star recruit by Rivals.com.

College career
Beasley accepted a scholarship from Southern Methodist University, where he was converted into a wide receiver, playing in 11 games with seven starts as a freshman, while finishing third on the team with 42 receptions for 366 yards and three touchdowns.

As a sophomore, Beasley started seven games, making 40 receptions (fourth on the team) for 493 yards and three touchdowns. SMU would win the 2009 Hawaii Bowl marking their first bowl invitation since the so-called death penalty.

As a junior, Beasley posted 87 receptions (second for a single-season in school history), 1,060 yards and six touchdowns.

As a senior, Beasley registered 86 receptions for 1,040 yards (second on the team) and two touchdowns.

Collegiate statistics

Professional career

Dallas Cowboys

2012 season
Beasley went undrafted in the 2012 NFL Draft due to his size and was signed by his hometown team, the Dallas Cowboys. Beasley left abruptly during training camp, stating he was dealing with "personal stuff", and even considered retiring from professional football. Beasley went on to have a sudden change of heart, returning and making the final 53-man roster.

Beasley finished his rookie year with 15 receptions for 128 yards in ten games and no starts.

2013 season
Beasley found ways to be productive while being surrounded by a solid corps of wide receivers, having the highest completion percentage of any receiver in the NFL with more than 10 targets. He was targeted by quarterback Tony Romo on third down, especially in spread formations. Much of this became attributed to Beasley's very good route running. 

Beasley finished his second professional season with 39 receptions for 368 yards and two touchdowns to go along with 79 return yards in 14 games and three starts.

2014 season
In 2014, Beasley posted 37 receptions (fourth on the team) for 420 yards (fourth on the team) and four touchdowns in 16 games and two starts. He averaged nearly 50 yards per game during the final six contests of the season. In the Wild Card Round against the Detroit Lions, Beasley made four catches – three for first downs- for 63 yards and recovered a fumble in the 24-20 victory.

2015 season
On March 3, the Cowboys signed Beasley for an additional four years, with a total contract value of $13.6 million. With leading receiver Dez Bryant injured for most of the season, Beasley finished with 52 receptions (tied for second on the team) for 537 yards and five touchdowns (led the team), while playing with four different starting quarterbacks with varying degrees of knowledge of the team's offense.

At the beginning of the year Beasley was used to fill in as a punt returner, due to his ball security ability. Beasley was eventually replaced by rookie Lucky Whitehead after having poor return averages and a critical muffed punt in a loss against the New York Giants.

2016 season

In 2016, Beasley posted career highs in receptions and yards, catching 75 passes for 833 yards and five touchdowns. His 76.5% catch rate ranked second among NFL wide receivers in 2016. In the Divisional Round against the Green Bay Packers, Beasley made four catches for 45 yards and had eight return yards in the 34-31 loss.

2017 season
In the 2017 season, Beasley finished with 36 receptions for 314 yards and four touchdowns.

2018 season
Beasley began the 2018 season with seven receptions for 73 yards in a 16–8 road loss to the Carolina Panthers. During Week 6 against the Jacksonville Jaguars, he had nine receptions for 101 yards and two touchdowns in the 40–7 victory. In the regular-season finale against the New York Giants, he caught six passes for 94 yards along with the game-winning touchdown in the narrow 36-35 road victory.

Beasley finished the 2018 season with 65 receptions for 672 yards and three touchdowns in 16 games and four starts. The Cowboys won the NFC East and earned the #4-seed in the NFC Playoffs. In the Wild Card Round against the Seattle Seahawks, Beasley had three receptions for 28 yards in the 24–22 victory. In the Divisional Round against the Los Angeles Rams, he had a 15-yard reception in the 30–22 road loss.

Buffalo Bills

2019 season

On March 13, 2019, Beasley signed a four-year, $29 million contract with the Buffalo Bills.

Beasley caught his first touchdown reception with the Bills in a 31–21 Week 6 win over the Miami Dolphins. Against the Dallas Cowboys, his former team, on Thanksgiving Day in Week 13, Beasley finished with six receptions for 110 yards and a touchdown as the Bills won on the road by a score of 26–15. During Week 16 against the New England Patriots, Beasley caught seven passes for 108 yards during the 24–17 road loss.

Beasley finished the 2019 season with 67 receptions for 778 yards and six touchdowns. In the Wild Card Round against the Houston Texans, he had four receptions for 44 yards in the 22-19 overtime road loss.

2020 season
Beasley was placed on the active/non-football injury list at the start of training camp on July 29, 2020. He was moved back to the active roster on August 12.

During a Week 3 35-32 victory over the Los Angeles Rams, Beasley had six receptions for 100 yards. During Week 7 against the New York Jets, he had 11 receptions for 112 yards in the 18–10 road victory. Three weeks later against the Arizona Cardinals, he had 11 receptions for 109 yards and a touchdown during the 32–30 road loss. During Week 12 against the Los Angeles Chargers, Beasley threw a touchdown pass to fellow wide receiver Gabe Davis on a trick play in the 27–17 victory.

During Week 13 against the San Francisco 49ers on Monday Night Football, Beasley recorded nine catches for 130 yards and a touchdown during the 34–24 road victory. Two weeks later against the Denver Broncos, he recorded eight catches for 112 yards during the 48–19 road victory. Beasley did not play in the regular-season finale against the Miami Dolphins due to a knee injury.

After setting career-highs with 82 catches and 967 yards, Beasley was named second-team All-Pro. He also scored four touchdowns.

In the Wild Card Round game against the Indianapolis Colts, Beasley caught seven passes for 57 yards in a 27–24 victory. His seven catches led the team and was a career-high for a playoff game. In the AFC Championship Game against the Kansas City Chiefs, Beasley recorded seven catches for 88 yards during the 38–24 road loss. After the season, Beasley revealed he had played through the 2020 playoffs with a partially broken fibula. He was ranked 96th by his fellow players on the NFL Top 100 Players of 2021.

2021 season 
In August 2021, Beasley was placed in a COVID-19 safety protocol.

During Week 6 against the Tennessee Titans, Beasley caught seven passes for 88 yards and his first touchdown of the season in the narrow 34–31 road loss. On December 21, 2021, Beasley was placed on the reserve/COVID-19 list after testing positive for the virus.  Beasley finished the 2021 season with 82 receptions for 693 receiving yards and one receiving touchdown.

During the 2022 offseason, Beasley was given permission to seek a trade outside Buffalo. He was released by the Bills on March 17, 2022.

Tampa Bay Buccaneers
On September 21, 2022, Beasley was signed to the Tampa Bay Buccaneers practice squad. On September 24, 2022, Beasley was elevated to the active roster for a game against the Green Bay Packers before being demoted back to the practice squad 2 days later. He was elevated to the active roster on October 1, 2022.

On October 5, Beasley announced his retirement.

Buffalo Bills (second stint)
On December 13, 2022, Beasley came out of retirement and re-signed with the Bills' practice squad. On January 12, 2023, Beasley was signed to the 53-man active roster.

NFL career statistics

Regular season

Postseason

Music career
Beasley released the debut single "80 Stings" in 2017. In 2018, he released his debut album The Autobiography produced by Victor "Phazz" Clark. The two teamed up to form ColdNation Records, an independent record label located in Frisco, Texas. He released a new single called "Sometimes" in January 2020.

Controversies
In June 2021, Beasley announced on social media that while he understood the NFL's interest in players getting the COVID-19 vaccine, he would forgo it nonetheless, even if it meant that he would have to end his playing career as a result. Beasley initially claimed he would stop discussing the issue publicly out of a desire to not be a "distraction" to his team. He then entered a public argument with Mark Cuban, who offered to buy Beasley's wife a share in Pfizer stock if Beasley got vaccinated and promoted the vaccine on his social media platforms. Beasley later entered a public back and forth with teammate Jerry Hughes over the NFL's newly-implemented vaccine rules. 

In August 2021, Beasley was removed from the Buffalo Bills' facility for close contact with a vaccinated COVID-19 positive staff member. On August 25, Beasley and teammate Isaiah McKenzie were fined $15,000 for violating the NFL's COVID-19 protocol by not wearing masks. Beasley again took to social media to voice his complaints and was poked fun at by his teammate Stefon Diggs who said "15k is a lot of money lol…" to which Beasley responded by saying "Lol not for you." He was placed back on the active roster on August 27. It was on the same day that Beasley publicly displayed a brain tattoo on his Instagram account. Beasley commented of the tattoo that it symbolized his desire for more "free thinking" in the league. 

On October 4, 2021, Beasley took to his Twitter account to criticize Bills fans who booed him at games due to his unvaccinated status. He then deactivated his Twitter account the following week. On December 26, 2021, ESPN reported that Beasley had "been fined multiple times for COVID-19 protocol violations, reaching a cumulative sum in the range of $100,000."

References

External links

SMU Mustangs bio

1989 births
Living people
American anti-vaccination activists
American football return specialists
American football wide receivers
Buffalo Bills players
Dallas Cowboys players
People from Little Elm, Texas
Players of American football from Texas
SMU Mustangs football players
Sportspeople from the Dallas–Fort Worth metroplex
Tampa Bay Buccaneers players